Admiral Carpenter may refer to:

Albert J. Carpenter (1911–1999), U.S. Coast Guard rear admiral
Alfred Carpenter (1881–1955), British Royal Navy vice admiral
Charles C. Carpenter (admiral) (1834–1899), U.S. Navy rear admiral
Charles L. Carpenter (1902–1992), U.S. Navy rear admiral
Walter Carpenter (1834–1904), British Royal Navy admiral
Wendi B. Carpenter (born 1956), U.S. Navy rear admiral

See also
Arthur S. Carpender (1884–1960), U.S. Navy admiral